Weirdale is a village in the Canadian province of Saskatchewan within the Rural Municipality of Garden River No. 490 and Census Division No. 15. Weirdale is about 48 km northeast of the City of Prince Albert along Highway 55.

History 
Weirdale was founded between 1929 and 1931. It was given life when the Canadian Pacific Railway opened a new frontier on the Canadian Prairies. When the pioneers arrived in the area, they cleared out the thick forest and muskeg by hand creating rich farmland. The pioneers had large families that lived on every quarter of farmland. In turn, these large families brought the population to the area. In the early part of 20th century, transportation was much slower than it is today so it was much more difficult to travel long distances. Because of the difficulties in travelling, many small communities had to become self-sustaining in order to survive. At one point, Weirdale housed a hospital, school, flour mill, puffed wheat factory, and a lumber yard as well as numerous other small business that sustained the community. As transportation advanced and became more efficient, which was aided by the construction of modern highways, small villages across the prairies began to die economically.

Weirdale incorporated as a village on April 1, 1948.

Demographics 

References

External links
Weirdale's Official Website

Villages in Saskatchewan
Garden River No. 490, Saskatchewan
Division No. 15, Saskatchewan